Red Lights is the debut studio album by British band Milestones, released on February 23, 2018 on Fearless Records.

Background
On January 26, 2018, the band released the lead single "Paranoid" and announced the album title and release date.

The band was inspired by Panic! at the Disco during the recording of the album.

Track listing
All tracks written by Milestones.
Bittersweetheart (3:21)
Once Upon a Time (3:15)
Paranoid (3:11)
Against the World (4:02)
Eighteen (3:24)
Liar (3:09)
Hold On (4:23)
End Game (2:57)
This is My Life (4:25)
Counting Cars (3:47)
Forever or Never (3:54)

Personnel
Matt Clarke - lead vocals
Drew Procter  - lead guitar
Mark Threlfall - bass guitar
Eden Leviston - rhythm guitar

References

External links

Red Lights at YouTube (streamed copy where licensed)

2018 albums
Fearless Records albums